Paul Renne (November 9, 1939 – April 18, 1970) was an American biathlete. He competed in the 20 km individual event at the 1964 Winter Olympics.

References

1935 births
Living people
American male biathletes
Olympic biathletes of the United States
Biathletes at the 1964 Winter Olympics
Sportspeople from Bozeman, Montana
20th-century American people